With the Lightnings is a 1998 science fiction novel by David Drake. It is the first part of the military space opera RCN Series.

Development 
The style and character dynamics trace their lineage back to A Grand Tour by David Drake from More Than Honor, a story in the Honorverse setting. Although the setting universe is entirely separate, careful reading may reveal similarities to the first novel in this series. Both were published in 1998. Indeed, Drake confirms that A Grand Tour is the conceptual antecedent of With the Lightnings.

Plot 
During a war between a Republic of Cinnabar and the Alliance of Free Stars, a coup d'état takes place on a neutral planet of Kostroma, with both factions becoming involved. Two Cinnabarian protagonists – a navy lieutenant and émigré librarian – find themselves in the center of the unfolding events.

References

External links 
 Author's note
 Official free ebook release,
 Thomas M. Wagner, Review, SfReviews, 2006
 Peter D. Tillman, Review, SFSite
 Donna McMahon, Review, SFSite

1998 American novels
1998 science fiction novels
Military science fiction novels
Space opera novels